, also known as Animax Awards, is a Japanese anime scriptwriting competition organized by the Japanese anime satellite television network, Animax, a subsidiary of Sony Pictures Entertainment.

History and broadcasts

Held annually since 2002, the competition awards the best original anime scripts submitted across Japan, judged by a panel of noted manga artists, animators and anime creators, which has included Ryōsuke Takahashi and Kaiji Kawaguchi among others, and which subsequently gets animated into an anime by a noted Japanese animation studio for broadcast on Animax's networks the following year. Winners of the Animax Award have gone on to forge successful careers in the anime and manga industry, with the second award winner, Yūko Kawabe going on to co-write Ergo Proxy and Tweeny Witches, among others, while the fourth winner, Ikuko Yoshinari, went on to publish a shōjo manga for Ribon.

The first four award-winning screenplays were animated by each of Animax's co-founders, the studios Sunrise, Toei Animation, and Tokyo Movie Shinsha, while the fifth and seventh were animated by Production I.G and the sixth animated by Sony's A-1 Pictures. In 2007, the awards were made open to Animax's viewers across its networks worldwide, under the name Animax Awards, with one of the winning scripts going on to be animated into the anime movie LaMB.

The seventh iteration of the award, in 2008, was won by Kenji Saidō, for his entry Shoka (lit. "Calligraphy"), and will be animated by Production I.G and to be broadcast on Animax's networks in 2009. The seventh iteration of the competition received a record of 1,235 entries, the largest in the competition's seven-year history, and its judging panel included manga artist Kaiji Kawaguchi, Detroit Metal City film screenwriter Mika Ōmori and Densha Otoko film screenwriter Arisa Kaneko. The award ceremony for the seventh iteration was also broadcast in Japan on November 9, 2008.

Winners

Super Kuma-san
—the first winner of the annual Animax Taishō in 2002.
 Original concept/story: 
 Director: Yukio Kaizawa
 Character design: Daisuke Yoshida
 Cast: Taiki Matsuno, others.
 Production: Toei Animation

Azusa, Otetsudai Shimasu!
—the second winner of the annual Animax Taishō in 2003.
 Original concept/story: 
 Director: Hajime Kamegaki
 Original character design: Rie Nakajima
 Cast: Mamiko Noto, others.
 Production: Tokyo Movie Shinsha (TMS Entertainment)

Hotori ~ Tada Saiwai wo Koinegau
—the third winner of the annual Animax Taishō in 2004.
 Original concept/story: 
 Director: Takeshi Annō
 Character design: Shin'ichi Yamashita
 Creative producer: Ryōsuke Takahashi
 Cast: Ryōko Shiraishi, others.
 Production: Sunrise

Lily to Kaeru to (Ototo)
—the fourth winner of the annual Animax Taishō in 2005. A manga adaptation was serialized in Shueisha's Ribon shōjo magazine.

 Original concept/story: 
 Director: Yuriko Kado
 Character design: Kozue Komatsu
 Cast: Chinami Nishimura, others
 Production: Toei Animation

Yumedamaya Kidan
—the fifth winner of the annual Animax Taishō in 2006. Animated by Production I.G., the script was the first winner not to be animated by one of Animax's co-founding studios.
 Original concept/story: 
 Director: Itsurō Kawasaki
 Original character design: Yōsuke Takahashi
 Character design: Shōko Nakamura
 Cast: Yūka Iguchi
 Production: Production I.G

Takane no Jitensha
—the sixth winner of the annual Animax Taishō in 2007. This was the first Animax Taishō to be open to an international audience as it was made available to Animax's broadcast networks worldwide. It was animated by A-1 Pictures, which was also established by one of Sony's subsidiaries, Aniplex. The supervising animation director and character designer was Sachiko Kamimura and featured Maaya Sakamoto as the title character.

 Original concept/story: 
 Director: Naru Ikeda
 Character design: Sachiko Kamimura
 Cast: Maaya Sakamoto, others.
 Production: A-1 Pictures

See also

 List of animation awards
 Animax

References

External links
 Animax's official website 
 Animax's official website for the sixth Animax Taishō 
 Animax's official Animax Taishō site—listing all recipients 
 Animax's Lily to Kaeru to (Ototo) website 
 

2002 establishments in Japan
Animax
Anime awards
Awards established in 2002
Japanese literary awards

ja:アニマックス大賞